ETBC may be:

 East Tennessee Breastfeeding Coalition
 East Texas Billing & Claims
 Europe Tamil Broadcasting Corporation
 Easy TestBench Creator

religious
 East Taylorsville Baptist Church, in Taylorsville, North Carolina
 East Texas Baptist College, now East Texas Baptist University
 East Troy Bible Church, in East Troy, Wisconsin
 East Tucson Baptist Church, in Tucson, Arizona
 El Toro Baptist Church, in Lake Forest, California